The title of Lord Pittenweem is a Scottish title of nobility. It was created by James VI as a barony in 1609 for Frederick Stewart, son of William Stewart, Commendator of Pittenweem. Fredrick Stewart assigned the title and lands of the Lordship and Barony to Thomas Erskine, Viscount Fenton, later 1st Earl of Kellie, in 1614.  Between 1631 and 1672 the Lordship and Barony was held by the Crown. It was held "in place of the late lords" so that when the Barony and Lordship later passed to the 3rd Earl of Kellie it was not as a new creation but by an assignation of the Lordship and Barony.

The title was used as a courtesy title for the eldest son of the Earls of Kellie until it was conveyed to Sir John Anstruther by Thomas Alexander Erskine, 6th Earl of Kellie and 6th Lord Baron of Pittenweem. Sir Windham Carmichael-Anstruther, 7th Baronet, 12th Baron of Pittenweem, succeeded in breaking the entail of his Anstruther estates, and sold them, together with the Lordship and Barony of Pittenweem to William Baird of Elie, who became the 13th Lord of Pittenweem in 1856.

The Lordship passed to Lady Lavinia Enid Muriel Baird in 1961 and was conveyed to the lawyer and Writer to The Signet William Ronald Crawford Miller in 1978.  After the Abolition of Feudal Tenure etc. (Scotland) Act 2000, the Lordship and Barony of Pittenweem became an incorporeal heritable property, no longer attached to the land.

William Ronald Crawford Miller, 17th Baron of Pittenweem, died in 2011. The Lord Lyon recognized Claes Zangenberg as the 18th Lord Baron of Pittenweem in a Letter Patent dated 27 June 2017.

Lords Pittenweem
1605-1614 :: Frederick Stewart, 1st Baron of Pittenweem.
1614-1631 :: Thomas Erskine, 1st Earl of Kellie, 2nd Baron of Pittenweem
1672-1677 :: Alexander Erskine, 3rd Earl of Kellie, 3rd Baron of Pittenweem
1677-1710 :: Alexander Erskine, 4th Earl of Kellie, 4th Baron of Pittenweem
1710-1756 :: Alexander Erskine, 5th Earl of Kellie, 5th Baron of Pittenweem
1756-1766 :: Thomas Alexander Erskine, 6th Earl of Kellie, 6th Baron of Pittenweem
1766-1799 :: Sir John Anstruther, 2nd Baronet, 7th Baron of Pittenweem
1799-1808 :: Sir Philip Anstruther-Paterson, 3rd Baronet, 8th Baron of Pittenweem
1808-1811 :: Sir John Anstruther, 1st Baronet of Fort William, 4th of Anstruther of Anstruther and Elie House, 9th Baron of Pittenweem
1811-1818 :: Sir John Carmichael-Anstruther, 2nd and 5th Baronet, 10th Baron of Pittenweem
1818-1831 :: Sir John Carmichael-Anstruther, 3rd and 6th Baronet, 11th Baron of Pittenweem
1831-1853 :: Sir Windham Carmichael-Anstruther, 7th Baronet, 12th Baron of Pittenweem
1853-1864 :: William Baird of Elie, 13th Baron of Pittenweem
1864-1918 :: William Baird, 14th Baron of Pittenweem
1918-1961 :: William James Baird, 15th Baron of Pittenweem
1961-1978 :: Lavinia Enid Muriel Baird, 16th Baroness of Pittenweem
1978-2011 :: William Ronald Crawford Miller, WS, 17th Baron of Pittenweem
2011-     :: Claes Zangenberg, 18th Baron of Pittenweem

References

 http://www.rps.ac.uk/
 http://www.scotsman.com/news/obituaries/obituary-ronald-miller-of-pittenweem-baron-writer-to-the-signet-1-1776534
 https://pacific.st-andrews.ac.uk/DServe/dserve.exe?dsqIni=Dserve.ini&dsqApp=Archive&dsqCmd=Show.tcl&dsqDb=Catalog&dsqSearch=((text)=%27msdep121%27)&dsqPos=2
 http://baronyofpittenweem.com

Extinct lordships of Parliament
Noble titles created in 1609
People from Pittenweem
Baronies in the Baronage of Scotland